Mounam Pesiyadhe is a 2002 Indian Tamil-language romantic drama film, written and directed by  Ameer in his directorial debut. It stars Suriya and debutant Trisha in the lead along with newcomers Nandha, Neha Pendse and choreographer-turned-actor Anju Mahendra in supporting roles along with several other newcomers, while Laila appears in a cameo role during the climax. The major part of the film is shot in Pondicherry. The film, released on 13 December 2002 and turned out to be a hit at the box office. It was remade in Telugu as Aadanthe Ado Type (2003) and later dubbed in the same language as Kaanchu (2006).

Plot 
Gautham (Suriya) and Kannan (Nandha) are close friends from childhood days. Gautham owns a restaurant while Kannan works as a sales executive in a firm. Kannan is in love with Mahalakshmmi "Maha" (Neha Pendse) while Gautham has no interest towards girls and prefers to be single despite his family members trying to get him married.
Sandhya (Trisha) is the relative of Kannan and their family members plan to get them married. Kannan is scared of his father and he is unable to inform about his love. So he requests Gautham to meet Sandhya and inform about the love between Kannan and Maha.

Gautham agrees and informs Sandhya about Kannan's love with Maha. Sandhya also says that even she is not interested in the marriage proposal and instead she prefers to marry someone like Gautham. Hearing this, Gautham is shocked and also confused.

Kannan and Sandhya's parents understand that neither Kannan nor Sandhya are interested in marriage and cancels the wedding plans between them. Meanwhile, Gautham develops affection towards Sandhya. Gautham receives frequent phone calls and he believes it to be from Sandhya. Gautham also gets gifts which he also believes to be sent by Sandhya.

One day, Sandhya calls Gautham to a restaurant. Gautham believes that she has called to convey her love but is shocked when she introduces Aravind as her lover. She also says that even Aravind is like Gautham who was not interested in girls but somehow is convinced by Sandhya. Gautham starts worrying and is confused about the happenings as he believed the phone calls and gifts were from Sandhya.

Maha's father gets angry knowing about her love and engages a few thugs to beat up Kannan. Kannan is injured which angers Gautham. He smashes all those thugs and scolds Maha's father for involving in such activities. Maha's father realises his mistake and apologises. Kannan and Maha's wedding is fixed.

On the day of Kannan and Maha's wedding, Gautham walks alone in the street thinking about his love failure. Suddenly a car comes in front of him and it is Laila. She walks towards Gautham and proposes her love. A small flashback is shown where Laila and Gautham were college mates and Laila was in love with Gautham. But Gautham did not reciprocate and avoided her during college.

On the last day of the college, Laila told Gautham that she will keep following him always and will never forget him. As she told, she kept following Gautham and it was her who kept calling Gautham and sent him frequent gifts which Gautham misunderstood to be from Sandhya. Gautham realises Laila's true love and accepts it. The movie ends with both leaving together in the car.

Cast 

 Suriya as Gowtham
 Trisha as Sandhya (Voice dubbed by Savitha Reddy)
 Nandha as Kannan
 Neha Pendse as Mahalakshmi
  Anju Mahendra as Selvam
 Duraipandi as Sundaram
 Vaidyanathan as Govindaraj
 V. C. Venkatesh as Shankaran
 Gopikumar as Shanmuganathan
 Saravanan as Auto Pandi
 Govindaraj as Palanisamy
 Kamalesh as Aravind
 Senthil as Sudhakar
 Johnprakash as Raj
 Master Tarun Kumar as Suresh
 Viji as Savithri
 Vijayalakshmi as Kamakshi
 Lakshmi as Varalakshmi
 Vaishnavi as Lakshmi
 Hemalatha as Shanthi
 Swetha as Indu
 Vidharth as drunkard
 Ameer as peon in Mahalakshmi's father's office
 Laila as Laila, Gautham's secret lover (cameo; also dubbed by Savitha Reddy)
 RJ Sanobar Sultana (cameo)

Production 
The film's titled is based on a serial that was supposed to be directed by Vikram with Ameer working as the assistant director. It also marks the first film for Trisha as lead actress. Shooting took place in New Zealand, Italy, Mauritius, Egypt and other scenic locations in and around India. Moreover, a huge set worth  was erected by art director Rajeevan at Pondicherry for a song. "Valentine" song was shot at AVM Studios, the rest of the songs were shot at locations in Mysore and Puducherry.

Soundtrack 
The soundtrack was composed by Yuvan Shankar Raja and released on 6 October 2002. It features 8 tracks overall with lyrics penned by Vaali, Kamakodiyan, Snehan, Puthuvai Nambi and director Ameer himself. The soundtrack, upon release, was very much appreciated and became very successful. Yuvan Shankar Raja himself claimed the album to be "the best he ever created since he became music director" till then.

Reception 
Malathi Rangarajan of The Hindu wrote that Ameer "has introduced an element of suspense in the story. The end shows that the director has tried to make things a little different. The comedy merges well with the main narration and the asides are examples of healthy humour". Visual Dasan of Kalki called the film "above average".

References

External links 
 

2000s Tamil-language films
2002 directorial debut films
2002 films
2002 romantic comedy-drama films
2002 romantic drama films
Films directed by Ameer (director)
Films scored by Yuvan Shankar Raja
Films shot in Egypt
Films shot in Italy
Films shot in Mauritius
Films shot in Mysore
Films shot in New Zealand
Films shot in Puducherry
Indian romantic drama films
Tamil films remade in other languages